Juli Sánchez (born 20 June 1978) is an Andorran international footballer. He currently plays as a forward for Inter Club d'Escaldes.

Sánchez formerly played for FC Andorra, CF Balaguer and CD Binéfar; he made his international debut in 1996, in Andorra's first ever FIFA recognised international, against Estonia. He also scored in their first ever win, against Belarus on 26 April 2000.

International statistics

International goals
Scores and results list Andorra's goal tally first.

|-
|1.||26 April 2000||Camp d'Esports d'Aixovall, Aixovall, Andorra||||||||Friendly||
|-
|}

References

External links

Profile at Andorra FA

1978 births
Living people
Andorran footballers
FC Andorra players
Andorra international footballers
CF Balaguer footballers
FC Santa Coloma players
CD Binéfar players
FC Lusitanos players
UE Santa Coloma players
Inter Club d'Escaldes players
Association football forwards